Nazmi Mehmeti (1918-1995), also recorded as “Mehmetovitch” on the SS Goya.

Biography
Mehmeti was an Albanian born on 25 March 1918 in Rečane, Macedonia, near Gostivar. Between 1931 and 1935, he attended a school in Bodesti, Romania, where his father operated a shop. Leaving school, he returned to Yugoslavia and worked on the family farm. He went to New Zealand in 1951, at the age of 33. Mehmeti was a very well known wrestler in Macedonia in his youth: he was tough, strong, and fought in the rugged mountains of the Balkans until the end of 1948 when he crossed the border into Greece. He had eight wounds in his body from fighting the communist secret service in Macedonia and Albania. His ‘application for registration as an alien’ in New Zealand, dated 25 May 1951 and witnessed by Constable K. H. English at Pahiatua, described Nazmi Mehmeti as 5”11, of good build, with brown hair and green eyes. His official ‘reason for leaving native country’ is listed as ‘fighting with partisan forces’. Apart from being a staunch patriot and firmly committed anti-communist, he was also a devoted Muslim, praying five times a day. He urged others to fast during Ramadan and to love their fellow man, “whoever says Amen”, irrespective of faith. In August 1957 Nazmi and his wife Sonya were interviewed by a civil servant processing their naturalisation application; he noted that Mrs Mehmet ‘has adopted the Moslem religion since her marriage to Mehmet’ and with regards to the oath of allegiance to New Zealand, ‘both wish to take the oath on the Koran.’

By trade, Mehmeti was a carpenter and worked around Lower Hutt, Upper Hutt, and Wellington. To start with, he built a house in Upper Hutt and he later moved on to Auckland. He also worked at the Meremere power station as a carpenter for a period. He made a marked contribution to the leadership of the New Zealand Muslim Association during the 1960s and is particularly remembered for his constant efforts to maintain the NZMA Islamic Centre property on Hargreaves Street.

Nazmi Mehmeti is largely responsible for securing the first Muslim cemetery in New Zealand (1963). Beforehand, Muslims were buried in various plots and even in the Chinese allotments. A few days before the festival of Eid al Adha in 1963, a Muslim burial plot was officially established in the Waikumete Cemetery in western Auckland. The Auckland City Council Parks and Library Committee confirmed a New Zealand Muslim Association petition for 100 places on 29 April 1963, following two meetings in March between the Director of Parks and several members of the executive committee, led by Nazmi Mehmeti, as president of the Association.

He shifted to Australia, worked in Sydney as a carpenter, and then bought a small farm. Later, he sold everything and went to Istanbul, Turkey. He returned to his native village of Rečane in Macedonia in the early 1990s after the fall of Communism there, and worked his father's land together with his brothers. He later died and was buried in Gostivar in 1995.

References

Further reading
 Bishop, Martin C. '“A History of the Muslim Community in New Zealand to 1980”, thesis submitted in partial fulfilment of the requirement for the degree of M.A. in history at the University of Waikato' (Waikato University, 1997).
 Drury, Abdullah, Islam in New Zealand: The First Mosque (Christchurch, 2007) 
 ‘Mehmetovich, Nazmi (Yugoslav), R24023062, National Archives, Wellington.

1918 births
1995 deaths
Albanian anti-communists
Macedonian anti-communists
New Zealand anti-communists
New Zealand religious leaders
Islam in New Zealand
Albanian Muslims
Macedonian Muslims
New Zealand Muslims
People from Gostivar Municipality
Yugoslav emigrants to New Zealand